Bestvina may refer to:
 Běstvina, a village in the Pardubice Region of the Czech Republic
 surname Bestvina:
 Mladen Bestvina,  Croatian American mathematician